CAPITAL 95.8FM (城市频道) is a Mandarin language news and information station operating in Singapore managed by Mediacorp. It was the only Mandarin radio station in Singapore before the introduction of its sister channels, YES 933 and Love 97.2FM in 1990 and 1994 respectively. It is one of the nation's oldest stations, and its origins can be traced back to the beginning of regulated radio broadcasting in Singapore/Straits Settlements along with Gold 905, Warna 94.2FM and Oli 96.8FM on 1 June 1936.

The station provides Mandarin news and information programs and broadcasts Mandarin hits.

The station ended its broadcast at Caldecott Hill at 10:00 on 8 February 2017 and thereafter moved to Mediacorp Campus at 1 Stars Avenue. The first programme to be broadcast at the new campus began on the same day.

The Station is also known to broadcast news daily in the Chinese Dialects like Hokkien, Teochew, Cantonese, Hainanese, Hakka and Fuzhounese on selected timing from Monday to Sunday.

Capital 958 adopts with the majority of the playlist consisting of all forms of different era of music which also included Xinyao. The station has provided songs even back from the 60s, 70s and 80s during weekends.

Shows produced 
 95.8 In Action!

See also
List of radio stations in Singapore

References

External links
CAPITAL 95.8FM Official Website

Radio stations in Singapore
Mandarin-language radio stations
Radio stations established in 1936
1936 establishments in Singapore